Scopula ectopostigma is a moth of the  family Geometridae. It is found in Equatorial Guinea (Bioko).

References

Moths described in 1932
Taxa named by Louis Beethoven Prout
ectopostigma
Moths of Africa
Fauna of Bioko